Christopher J. Donelan (born December 25, 1964 in Athol, Massachusetts) is an American law enforcement officer and politician who is the current Sheriff of Franklin County, Massachusetts. A Democrat, he served as a member of the Massachusetts House of Representatives from 2003 to 2011.

References

1964 births
Living people
People from Athol, Massachusetts
Westfield State University alumni
American International College alumni
Massachusetts sheriffs
Massachusetts Democrats
People from Orange, Massachusetts